Bahrud (also Romanized as Baḩrūd) is a village in Takht-e Jolgeh Rural District, in the Central District of Firuzeh County, Razavi Khorasan Province, Iran. At the 2006 census, its population was 256, in 58 families.

See also 

 List of cities, towns and villages in Razavi Khorasan Province

References 

Populated places in Firuzeh County